Diego Francesco Carlone (1674 – 25 June 1750) was an Italian sculptor. He was born in Scaria into a family of artists. His father owned a workshop where Carlone learned the sculpting trade and eventually inherited the business. The workshop produced stucco decorations for a number of churches in the neighboring area. He died in 1750.

References

1674 births
1750 deaths
People from the Province of Como
17th-century Italian sculptors
Italian male sculptors
18th-century Italian sculptors
18th-century Italian male artists